Dave Green (born 1983) is an American film and music video director. He is well known for directing several music videos and short films, especially working with Miles Fisher. He made his directorial debut with the 2014 film Earth to Echo, and then directed the 2016 film, Teenage Mutant Ninja Turtles: Out of the Shadows. He is set to direct Coyote vs. Acme for Warner Bros..

Career 
Green directed several music videos, including Miles Fisher's cover of the Talking Heads 2009 song "This Must Be the Place". He also directed the short animated comedy film Meltdown in 2009, in which David Cross voiced over the main role.

In 2010, Green directed a short film spoof titled Pinkberry: The Movie, starring Miles Fisher. Later he directed a television short series, Zombie Roadkill, starring Thomas Haden Church and produced by Sam Raimi.

In 2011, Green and Fisher made a viral short film New Romance along with Jake Avnet to promote Final Destination 5. Later he directed another short, Dial M for Murder, for the Funny or Die.

Green was set to make his directorial debut with a science-fiction adventure film titled Earth to Echo by Walt Disney Pictures on May 22, 2012. Disney sold the film's rights to Relativity Media in 2013. Andrew Panay produced the film, which was scripted by Henry Gayden and starred Astro, Reese Hartwig, and Teo Halm. The film was released on July 2, 2014, grossing more than $45 million.

In August 2013, Warner Bros. set Green to direct sci-fi action Lore, based on the graphic novel written by Ashley Wood and T.P. Louise. Cory Goodman and Jeremy Lott wrote the script, while Dwayne Johnson was cast in the lead role. Barry Sonnenfeld was previously attached to direct the film.

On December 4, 2014, Green was set by Paramount Pictures to direct Teenage Mutant Ninja Turtles: Out of the Shadows, a sequel to the 2014 film Teenage Mutant Ninja Turtles, directed by Jonathan Liebesman, which grossed $493 million worldwide. The first film's screenwriters, Josh Appelbaum and André Nemec, wrote the script for the film, which was released on June 3, 2016. Michael Bay produced the film, which starred Alan Ritchson, Jeremy Howard, Pete Ploszek, and Noel Fisher. Filming began in April 2015 in New York City and Buffalo.

On December 17, 2019, it was reported that Green will direct a live-action/animated film based on Looney Tunes character Wile E. Coyote, titled Coyote vs. Acme. James Gunn and Chris DeFaria will produce the film. Coyote vs. Acme was originally set to be released on July 21, 2023. However, Greta Gerwig's Barbie movie took that slot.

Filmography 
 Earth to Echo (2014)
 Teenage Mutant Ninja Turtles: Out of the Shadows (2016)
 Coyote vs. Acme (TBA)

References

External links 
 

1983 births
Living people
American film directors
Place of birth missing (living people)
American music video directors